The 1915 Mercer Baptists football team was an American football team that represented Mercer University as a member of the Southern Intercollegiate Athletic Association (SIAA) during the 1915 college football season. In their first year under head coach Jake Zellars, the team compiled an 5–4 record, with a mark of 2–3 in the SIAA.

Schedule

References

Mercer
Mercer Bears football seasons
Mercer Baptists football